Homer Howard Haworth (August 27, 1893 – January 28, 1953) was a Major League Baseball catcher who played for one season. He played seven games for the Cleveland Indians during the 1915 Cleveland Indians season.

External links

1893 births
1953 deaths
People from Newberg, Oregon
Cleveland Indians players
Major League Baseball catchers
Baseball players from Oregon
Portland Beavers players
Great Falls Electrics players
Oakland Oaks (baseball) players
Birmingham Barons players
Fort Worth Panthers players
Atlanta Crackers players
Des Moines Demons players
Tulsa Oilers (baseball) players
San Francisco Seals (baseball) players
Burials at Willamette National Cemetery
Pendleton Buckaroos players
People from Troutdale, Oregon
Ballard Pippins players